Frances Goerhing Swayze (February 11, 1901 – January 1, 1994) was an American politician in the state of Washington. She served in the Washington House of Representatives from 1953 to 1966 for District 26.

References

1901 births
1994 deaths
Republican Party members of the Washington House of Representatives
People from Council Bluffs, Iowa
Women state legislators in Washington (state)
20th-century American politicians
20th-century American women politicians